Rollins State Park is a public recreation area on the southern slope of Mount Kearsarge in Warner, New Hampshire. The state park is at the entrance to an auto road that ascends to within  of the summit. Picnic facilities are available, and hiking trails leave from the high point of the auto road to the summit. The park is named for Frank W. Rollins, who served as governor of New Hampshire from 1899 to 1901.

Greenway
The park is on the Sunapee-Ragged-Kearsarge Greenway, a  loop trail that also passes Winslow State Park, on the northwest flank of Mount Kearsarge, Mount Sunapee State Park, and Wadleigh State Park, as well as Gile, Kearsarge and Shadow Hill state forests and the Bog Mountain Wildlife Management Area.

References

External links
Rollins State Park New Hampshire Department of Natural and Cultural Resources

State parks of New Hampshire
Parks in Merrimack County, New Hampshire
Warner, New Hampshire
Protected areas established in 1950
1950 establishments in New Hampshire